The Ministry of Defence Magnetic Range, (a.k.a. the Portland Bill Land Magnetic Facilities or the Defence Test and Evaluation Organisation Establishment) is a Ministry of Defence site used for magnetic measurement on the Isle of Portland, Dorset, England. The facility is situated at Portland Bill, where tests can be performed well away from stray electric and magnetic fields.

History
The site was chosen during the 1960s for magnetic measurement due to Portland Bill's remoteness and magnetic cleanliness. As Portland stone is non-magnetic, as well as the site's remoteness, the site is free from any magnetic disturbance such as heavy traffic, and as a result, very small magnetic fields from equipment can be measured with a very high degree of accuracy. The site is used to magnetically assess any item, but mainly MCMV and EOD equipment. Magnetic compasses can also be tested. The unique facility is both notified and approved by the Maritime and Coastguard Agency and is the only accredited centre for Type Approval of Magnetic Compasses and Binnacles in the United Kingdom.

The site holds various facilities. The main Land Magnetic Range is a secure and magnetically stable environment, used to measure the magnetic fields found in Mine Counter Measure Vessel equipment. The range uses inbuilt coil systems which enable the Earth's magnetic field to be reduced to zero, simulate anywhere on the planet, or provide only the vertical or horizontal portion of the Earth field to pass through the item under test, which an equivalent Sea Range cannot do. The Compass Test Centre inspects and tests magnetic compasses, whilst also delivering them to RAF stations across the UK. The Compass Base Calibration Surveys is a designated area of survey and certification, used for accurate swinging of Aircraft Navigation Equipment for both military and civilian airfields.

References 

Isle of Portland
Installations of the Ministry of Defence (United Kingdom)